Events in the year 1971 in Spain.

Incumbents
Caudillo: Francisco Franco

Births
18 January: Pep Guardiola, football player and manager.
11 May: Alberto Rodríguez Librero.
28 July: Fernando Teixeira Vitienes.
8 November: Carlos Atanes, film director

Deaths
1 July:Pepe Brand. (b. 1900)

See also
 List of Spanish films of 1971

References

 
Years of the 20th century in Spain
1970s in Spain
Spain
1971 in Europe